The Columbia Basin Herald (CBH) is a daily newspaper based in Moses Lake, Washington, United States. It was founded in 1941 and is owned by the Hagadone News Network. The newspaper serves Central Washington and is the legal newspaper of record for Moses Lake, Royal City, and Grant County.  The newspaper became a daily newspaper in March 1955, to be published 5 afternoons weekly, and renamed the Columbia Basin Daily Herald.  Prior to that, the CBH had been printed twice-weekly from late 1953 until March 1955 and was a weekly from its inception in (sic) 1942.

In May 1947, the CBH was elected to membership in the Associated Press.  

In March 1962, the Inland Empire Press-Radio-TV journalism awards were made in Spokane, WA, with the CBH earning a mention for reporter Elton Troth's articles about the Grant County PUD probe of the Priest Rapids dam, and for Ned Thomas' article about journalists meeting with President John F. Kennedy during his visit to Moses Lake.  Ned Thomas subsequently moved from CBH to the Port Angeles Evening News in October 1967, where he assumed duties as editor and associate publisher.  Thomas had been in Moses Lake for 21 years and earned numerous journalism awards.  Elton Troth also departed Moses Lake (1966) to work as an Information Officer for the Washington State Division of Vocational Rehabilitation in Olympia, Washington. 

In May 1983, the CBH won 5 awards at the combined Region 10 and Inland Empire Society of Professional Journalists Sigma Delta Chi awards in Spokane.  By comparison, the Spokane-based Spokesman-Review and Spokane Chronicle won 56 awards.  The Chronicle had merged with the Spokeman-Review in January 1983. 

Until 2021, the newspaper operated a weekly named the Othello Outlook to cover Othello.

References

Mass media in Grant County, Washington
Newspapers published in Washington (state)
Moses Lake, Washington
Newspapers established in 1941